Jaroslav Vlach  (born April 6, 1992) is a Czech professional ice hockey player. He is currently playing with the HC Bílí Tygři Liberec of the Czech Extraliga.

Vlach made his Czech Extraliga debut playing with HC Bílí Tygři Liberec during the 2012–13 Czech Extraliga season.

References

External links

1992 births
Living people
People from Kutná Hora District
Czech ice hockey forwards
HC Bílí Tygři Liberec players
Sportspeople from the Central Bohemian Region